Abbasalutely is a compilation album released in 1995 by New Zealand recording label Flying Nun Records as a tribute album to ABBA.

Track listing

Versions

Abbasalutely (Cass, Comp) Flying Nun Records, Festival Records, New Zealand 1995
Abbasalutely (CD, Comp) Sony Records  Japan 1995
Abbasalutely (CD, Comp) Festival Records, New Zealand 1995

See also
List of ABBA tribute albums

References

Davey, T. & Puschmann, H. (1996) Kiwi rock. Dunedin: Kiwi Rock Publications.

External links
Flying Nun's Abbasalutely page Other Versions

Compilation albums by New Zealand artists
1995 compilation albums
ABBA tribute albums
Flying Nun Records compilation albums
Alternative rock compilation albums